The Columbia-class cruisers were two protected cruisers constructed in 1890 and 1891 and used by the United States Navy. They were lightly gunned ships with only moderate armor that were built for the speed needed to overtake and destroy the fast ocean liners of the day as commerce raiders. However, the light armament and armor left these ships over-specialized and outclassed by ordinary similar sized protected cruisers that they might encounter. Also, the engines were expensive to operate and at full power the ships' range was greatly decreased. Due to the ongoing size and speed race in ocean liners, by 1907 they were outclassed in speed by the ill-fated  and the German liner .

Columbia was authorized by an Act of Congress approved 30 June 1890, and Minneapolis was authorized by an Act approved 2 March 1891.

Design and construction

Due to their design, this type of ship was criticized as being not much better than an armed merchant cruiser. During the Spanish–American War, for example, Columbia was used as a troop transport, while both ships of the class were used as scouts.

Foreign equivalents
This type of large (but under-armed) specialized commerce raider was built by several other countries. The German cruiser SMS Kaiserin Augusta also had a triple-screw design and was nearly as long as the American Columbia-class ships, but had a more general role instead of a specialized commerce raider. The British were the most probable target of most of these ships, and invested in various cruiser designs as a counter to the perceived threat.

Acquisition

US Representative Charles A. Boutelle of Maine was the primary advocate of these ships in Congress, and overcame significant opposition to get them built. William Cramp & Sons of Philadelphia was the sole bidder for Columbia, ordered in fiscal year 1891. Minneapolis was ordered the following year and described as the "most important ship" in that year's program. Bath Iron Works of Bath, Maine was the lowest bidder, but Bath could not build their own engines nor complete the ship in time. So the contract was awarded to Cramp, on condition that they lower their price $55,000 to meet Bath's bid.

Engineering

Engineer-in-Chief George W. Melville was personally involved in its design. To achieve this a triple-screw powerplant, the first in the US Navy, was designed. Eight or ten (references vary, possibly 8 in Columbia and 10 in Minneapolis) coal-fired cylindrical boilers supplied steam to three triple-expansion engines. Both ships exceeded their design speed on trials; Columbia made  and Minneapolis made .

Consideration was also given to survivability in the event of battle damage. Each engine was in a separate compartment, and the center screw was  aft of the outboard screws, minimizing the chance of more than one screw being disabled by a single hit. Columbia was built with four funnels while Minneapolis had two; it is possible this, along with the main gun placement on the aft deck, was intended to make the ships resemble their prey from a distance.

The normal coal allowance was 800 tons. It seems this proved impractical, as the full load coal allowance is given in the same source as 1,576 tons.

In July 1895 Columbia made a transatlantic crossing from Southampton to Sandy Hook in 6 days, 23 hours, 49 minutes for an average speed of 18.41 knots. This was without forced draft and was said to be the fastest crossing for a warship to that date. However, the record holder at the time was an ocean liner, the German Hamburg America Line's  with a time of 6 days, 10 hours, 32 minutes.

Protection

Armament

The originally designed main armament for Columbia was four /40 caliber guns, two forward and two aft, but during construction the aft pair was replaced by a single /40 caliber Mark 5 gun. The two 6-inch guns were side by side just forward of the superstructure. Secondary armament included eight /40 caliber rapid fire (RF) guns in sponsons in the hull, 12 6-pounder RF guns, four 1-pounder RF guns, and four Gatling guns. A field artillery piece on a wheeled carriage was also carried for use by landing parties. The ships also had four torpedo tubes,  on Columbia for Howell torpedoes and 18 inch (450 mm) on Minneapolis.

Refits
All torpedo tubes were removed by 1904. Both ships were out of commission for a long period, Columbia 1907–1915 and Minneapolis 1906–1917. During re-activation refits at the end of these periods the lone 8-inch gun was replaced by a third /40 caliber gun. This was part of a general withdrawal from service of 8-inch Mark 5 guns due to a tendency to burst. Two 4-inch guns were also removed by 1917, leaving six guns. One source states that two additional 4-inch guns were removed and two /50 caliber anti-aircraft guns were added circa 1918.

Service
Both ships were commissioned in 1894 and were initially assigned to the North Atlantic Squadron. Columbia was involved in an intervention in Nicaragua July–August 1894. She cruised to Europe before being placed in reserve in May 1897. Minneapolis was in the European Squadron from 1895 to 1897 and was then placed in reserve in July 1897.

Both ships were re-activated with the outbreak of the Spanish–American War in March 1898, commencing the search for Admiral Cervera's squadron soon after. It was feared that Cervera's fleet would bombard the US East Coast. Columbia searched as far north as Maine, Minneapolis as far south as Venezuela. Neither appears to have encountered enemy ships during the war. Columbia carried troops to the invasion of Guánica, Puerto Rico on 25–26 July and supported the Puerto Rican Campaign through 14 August.

Minneapolis was placed in reserve in August 1898 as soon as hostilities ceased, Columbia following her in March 1899. Both recommissioned as receiving ships in 1902, Columbia soon joining the Atlantic Training Squadron until again decommissioning in 1907. Minneapolis joined a Special Service Squadron in 1905, making astronomical and other observations off Spain and Africa, including a solar eclipse on 30 August. She was present for the arrival of the body of John Paul Jones at the Naval Academy in Annapolis, Maryland in mid-1906. After some training cruises, she was decommissioned in late 1906.

Columbia was recommissioned in 1915 as flagship of the Submarine Flotilla. Following the American entry into World War I in April 1917, Minneapolis was recommissioned and both ships served as convoy escorts. In early 1919, with the war over, Columbia served in the Atlantic and Minneapolis served in the Pacific until both were decommissioned in 1921. Both were sold for scrap in 1921–22.

Legacy

Minneapolis mast and bell, the only surviving parts of her, are preserved on the northeastern shore of Lake Calhoun, near Lake Street in Minneapolis. The ship's wheel was also preserved, but was stolen.

Ships in class

The two ships of the Columbia class were:

Columbia was renamed Old Columbia on 17 November 1921 to avoid confusion with the auxiliary ship . On 17 July 1920 these ships were redesignated with the new hull numbers CA-16 (heavy cruiser) and CA-17.

See also
 List of cruisers of the United States Navy

References

Bibliography

External links

Cruiser Photo Gallery Index at NavSource Naval History
Global Security.org - Columbia class cruiser
Global Security.org - Columbia class cruiser specifications

Cruiser classes